Hobeish may refer to:

 Hobeysh, a village in Veys Rural District, Veys District, Bavi County, Khuzestan Province, Iran
 Habishi, a village in Mollasani Rural District, in the Central District of Bavi County
 Jabal Hubaysh (disambiguation), several mountains

See also 
 Habishi (disambiguation)